A list of films produced in France in 1993.

References

External links
 1993 in France
 French films of 1993 at the Internet Movie Database
French films of 1993 at Cinema-francais.fr

1993
Films
French